Véra Norman (born 28 December 1924) is a French film actress.

Selected filmography
 The Sea Rose (1946)
 The Man from Jamaica (1950)
 Lady Paname (1950)
 Imperial Violets (1952)
 A Caprice of Darling Caroline (1953)
 This Man Is Dangerous (1953)
 The Pirates of the Bois de Boulogne (1954)
 Stain in the Snow (1954)
 One Bullet Is Enough (1954)

References

Bibliography
 Goble, Alan. The Complete Index to Literary Sources in Film. Walter de Gruyter, 1999.

External links

1927 births
Possibly living people
Actresses from Paris
French film actresses